Chakhansur may refer to:

Chakhansur District, a district in Nimroz Province, Afghanistan
Chakhansur (village) , a village and the center of the above district in Nimroz Province, Afghanistan